Burj Littan is a small farming village in the Northern Indian state of Punjab.

Demographics 
This village is predominantly occupied by Sikh people, along with several Gurdwaras. Burj Littan has 9 Gurudwara Sahib.

Culture 
Within the community of Burj Littan, many individuals partake in Kabbaddi, Punjab’s national game. Excellent Kabbaddi players came from Burj Littan; the majority of which are now students in Canada.

References 

Villages in Ludhiana district